Sibusiso Mbonani (born 10 June 1987) is a South African soccer player who last played as a defender for South African Premier Division side Sekhukhune United.

Career
He signed for Polokwane City in July 2015.

References

1987 births
Living people
People from Elias Motsoaledi Local Municipality
Sportspeople from Limpopo
South African soccer players
Association football forwards
Witbank Spurs F.C. players
Polokwane City F.C. players
Sekhukhune United F.C. players
South African Premier Division players
National First Division players